Vera Reynolds (born Vera Nancy Reynolds; November 25, 1899 – April 22, 1962) was an American film actress.

Early life and career
Born in Richmond, Virginia, in 1899, Reynolds first worked in films at age 12. She began as a dancer, worked as one of the Sennett Bathing Beauties, and became a leading lady in silent motion pictures. Among her film credits are starring roles in Sam Wood's Prodigal Daughters (1923), and Cecil B. DeMille's Feet of Clay (1924), The Golden Bed (1925), The Road to Yesterday (1925) and Dragnet Patrol (1931) with George "Gabby" Hayes.

Controversy

On August 28, 1927, police in Hollywood reported that Reynolds had taken poison. Later the same evening she clarified what had occurred. She explained that an excited telephone operator had phoned the police when her mother requested a doctor. The police arrived along with an ambulance. The actress was found unconscious on the floor of a bathroom in her Hollywood home. Police responded initially to moans from the actress's mother who was outside the bathroom. When the door was opened they found the younger woman writhing in pain. Reynolds' mother believed her daughter had taken the poison by mistake, believing it to be medicine. Despite the actress's protestations she was transported to the emergency room and given emergency treatment. The attending physician said that he failed to find any trace of poison. Instead he thought Reynolds may have suffered an attack brought on by acute indigestion or ptomaine poisoning. Police had discovered a half-filled bottle of poison in the bathroom which led to their initial conclusion. Vera, upon returning to her home, described the initial report as "ridiculous"; saying "I have too much to live for." She said, "Life is indeed very sweet and I am certainly not ready to end it yet."

Marriages
She married twice:
To comedian Earl Montgomery; they divorced in 1926.
To Robert Ellis du Reel (1892–1974). In March 1938, Reynolds brought a breach of promise suit against Reel was reported. She sued Reel for $150,000, and contended she lived with Reel for nine years before she learned that they were not married. The suit claimed he promised to marry her, but failed to do so. During a recess in the trial Hollywood film director Robert G. Vignola, who believed the case could be reconciled out of court, assumed the role of peacemaker. Reynolds claimed to have had a marriage ceremony with Reel in Greenwich, Connecticut in 1926. Reel denied there had been a wedding, and stated the two had lived together unmarried. He remarked they "had the edge" on their unhappy married friends.

Death
Reynolds died in Hollywood on April 22, 1962, aged 62, at the Motion Picture Country Hospital in Woodland Hills, California. She was buried in Valhalla Memorial Park, North Hollywood.

Filmography

 Luke's Trolley Troubles (1917, Short)
 That Dawgone Dog (1917, Short) as The Girl
 A Self-Made Hero (1917, Short)
 A Winning Loser (1917, Short)
 His Criminal Career (1917, Short)
 A Laundry Clean-Up (1917, Short)
 A Janitor's Vengeance (1917, Short)
 His Sudden Rival (1917, Short)
 His Hidden Talent (1917, Short) as The Fellow's Sweetheart
 Caught in the End (1917, Short) as The Jealous Husband's Wife
 A Prairie Heiress (1917, Short)
 It Pays to Exercise (1918, Short) as Gym Girl (uncredited)
 A Saphead's Sacrifice (1920, Short)
 Twin Bedlam (1920, Short)
 Dry and Thirsty (1920, Short) as Mrs. Tryan
 Parked in the Park (1920, Short)
 Rough on Rubes (1920, Short)
 Kissed in a Harem (1920, Short)
 Beaned on the Border (1920, Short)
 Stay Down East (1921, Short)
 Should Brides Marry? (1921, Short)
 Home Blues (1921, Short)
 His Hansom Butler (1921, Short)
 Designing Husbands (192, Short)
 Cleo's Easy Mark (1921, Short)
 All at Sea (1921, Short)
 Tomale-O (1922, Short)
 Sweet Cookie (1922, Short)
 Koo Koo Kids (1922, Short)
 What Next? (1922, Short)
 Whose Husband Are You? (1922, Short)
 Rented Trouble (1922, Short)
 But a Butler! (1922, Short)
 Easy Pickin' (1922, Short)
 The Pest (1922, Short) as The poor tenant
 Prodigal Daughters (1923) as Marjory Forbes
 Woman-Proof (1923) as Celeste Rockwood
 Chop Suey Louie (1923, Short)
 Shadows of Paris (1924) as Liane
 Flapper Wives (1924) as Sadie Callahan
 Icebound (1924) as Nettie Moore
 For Sale (1924) as Betty Twombly-Smith
 Broken Barriers (1924) as Sadie Denton
 Feet of Clay (1924) as Amy Loring
 Cheap Kisses (1924) as Kitty Dillingham
 The Night Club (1925) as Grace Henderson
 The Golden Bed (1925) as Margaret Peake
 The Million Dollar Handicap (1925)
 The Limited Mail (1925) as Caroline Dale
 Without Mercy (1925) as Margaret Garth
 The Road to Yesterday (1925) as Beth Tyrell
 Steel Preferred (1925) as Amy Creeth
 Silence (1926) as Norma Drake / Norma Powers
 Sunny Side Up (1926) as Sunny Ducrow
 Risky Business (1926) as Cecily Stoughton
 Corporal Kate (1926) as Kate O'Reilly
 The Little Adventuress (1927) as Helen Davis
 Wedding Bill$ (1927)
 The Main Event (1927) as Glory Frayne
 Almost Human (1927) as Mary Kelly
 Golf Widows (1928) as Alice Anderson
 The Divine Sinner (1928) as Lillia Ludwig
 Jazzland (1928) as Stella Baggott
 Back from Shanghai (1929)
 Tonight at Twelve (1929) as Barbara Warren
 The Last Dance (1930) as Sally Kelly
 The Lone Rider (1930) as Mary Stevens
 Borrowed Wives (1930) as Alice Blake
 The Lawless Woman (1931) as June Page
 Hell-Bent for Frisco (1931) as Ellen Garwood
 Neck and Neck (1931) as Norma Rickson
 Dragnet Patrol (1931) as Millie White
 The Monster Walks (1932) as Ruth Earlton
 Gorilla Ship (1932) as Helen Wells
 Tangled Destinies (1932) as Ruth, the Airline Stewardess (final film role)

References

Dunkirk Evening Observer, "Breach Of Promise Suit Of Vera Reynolds Is Near Settlement", Saturday, March 26, 1938, p. 3
Los Angeles Times, "Screen Star Vera Reynolds Funeral Set", April 25, 1962, Page B1
Newark Advocate and American Tribune (Ohio), "Vera Reynolds, Pretty Blue-eyed Brunet, Possesses the Unusual - Is Popular", Saturday, July 28, 1928, p. 7
Oakland Tribune, "Vera Reynolds Not Poisoned", August 29, 1927, p. 1
 St. Johns, Ivan, "A Surf Board Flapper," Photoplay, September 1924, p. 65.
Syracuse Herald, "Vera Reynolds Wearies Of Being Farmed Out", July 31, 1928, p. 9

External links

 
 Photographs and literature on Vera Reynolds

Actresses from Richmond, Virginia
American film actresses
American silent film actresses
American female dancers
1899 births
1962 deaths
20th-century American actresses
WAMPAS Baby Stars
20th-century American dancers